Catalina Villas is a neighborhood in Pasadena, California. It is bordered by Orange Grove Boulevard to the north, Walnut Street and Colorado Boulevard to the south, Lake and Wilson Avenues to the west, and Hill Avenue to the east.

Landmarks
There is heavy commercial development on Colorado Boulevard, Walnut Street, Lake Avenue, and Hill Avenue. The neighborhood is bisected by the I-210 and has no parks.

Education
Catalina Villas is served by Jefferson and McKinley Elementary Schools; Wilson, McKinley, and Eliot Middle Schools; and Pasadena and Muir High Schools.

Transportation
The Metro Gold Line has a station on Lake Avenue at the Interstate 210. The neighborhood is served by Metro Local line 662; and Pasadena Transit routes 20 and 40.

Neighborhoods in Pasadena, California